The Tower may refer to:

Architecture 
 Tower of London, a castle in London, England, started in 1078
 The Tower (Dubai), a building in United Arab Emirates, built in 2002
 The Tower at Dubai Creek Harbour, a building in United Arab Emirates
 Partnership House, an office tower in Newcastle upon Tyne, England originally named The Tower
 The Tower, Meridian Quay, a residential tower in Swansea, Wales
 The Tower Jakarta, an office tower in Indonesia
 Nakheel Tower or The Tower, a skyscraper under construction in the United Arab Emirates
 Prospect Park Water Tower, an historic water tower on top of Tower Hill Park in Minneapolis, Minnesota, U.S.
 The Tower (Fort Worth, Texas), a residential tower in Texas, U.S.
 Main Building (University of Texas at Austin) or The Tower, Texas, U.S.
 Tower Theatre (disambiguation), several theaters

Literature 
 The Tower (poetry collection), a book of poems by William Butler Yeats, published in 1928
 "The Tower" (poem), by William Butler Yeats
 The Tower (play), a 1925 play by Hugo von Hofmannsthal
 The Tower (Stern novel), a novel by Richard Martin Stern, 1973, adapted into the film The Towering Inferno
The Tower (Wilson novel), a novel by Colin Wilson
 La Tour (comics), known in English as The Tower, the third volume of the Belgian graphic novel series Les Cités Obscures
 The Tower Magazine, a monthly online magazine on Israel and Middle East subjects edited by David Hazony
 The Tower, a student newspaper of Kean University

Film and television  
 "The Tower" (Stargate Atlantis), an episode from the television show
 The Tower: A Tale of Two Cities, a BBC documentary of the Pepys Estate in South London
 The Tower (1965 film), an Australian television play
 The Tower (1993 film), a 1993 action and drama film with music composed by John D'Andrea
 The Tower (2002 film), an American film whose music was composed by Christopher Young
 The Tower (2012 South Korean film), starring Son Ye-jin and Sol Kyung-gu
 The Tower (2012 German film), a TV drama film based on the novel by Uwe Tellkamp
 The Tower (2018 film), a 2018 Norwegian film
 "The Tower" (Once Upon a Time), a 2014 television episode
 "The Tower" (The Walking Dead), a 2020 television episode
 The Tower (2021 TV series), a three-part series produced by ITV

Music 
 The Tower (opera), an American opera by Marvin David Levy
 The Tower (The Legendary Pink Dots album), a 1984 album
 The Tower (Bob Catley album), released in 1998
 "The Tower", a song on the album Wrong by NoMeansNo
 "The Tower", a song on the album Spanish Train and Other Stories by Chris de Burgh
 "The Tower", a song on the album The Tempest by Insane Clown Posse
 "The Tower", a song on the album Phobos by Voivod
 "The Tower", a song on the album The Chemical Wedding by Bruce Dickinson
 "The Tower", a song on the album The Metal Opera by Avantasia
 "The Tower", a song on the album Waking Hour by Vienna Teng
 "The Tower", a song on the album O.G. Original Gangster by Ice-T
 The Tower (news music), a television news music package for NBC affiliates by 615 Music
 "Celestial (The Tower)", a song on the album Celestial by Isis

Other 
 The Tower (Tarot card), or The Tower (XVI), a Major Arcana card in Tarot
 The Japanese name for the computer game SimTower
 The Tower SP, a 2005 skyscraper simulation game and spiritual sequel to SimTower
 The Tower (Lynch, Nebraska), a hill visited by the Lewis and Clark Expedition
 The Tower (Alberta), the unofficial name for a peak located in the Kananaskis Range

See also 
 Tower (disambiguation)
 The Towers (disambiguation)
 Skyscraper (disambiguation)